Muriel Frost is a fictional character who appeared in the Doctor Who Magazine comic strip based on the long-running British science fiction television series Doctor Who. An officer in the British Army, she worked for UNIT (United Nations Intelligence Taskforce), an international organisation that defends the Earth from alien threats.

A fiery redhead, both in hair colour and temperament, Frost was a no-nonsense and efficient UNIT operative who nonetheless had problems maintaining personal relationships. She first appeared, with the rank of captain, in the comic strip story The Mark of Mandragora, published in DWM #169-#172, written by Dan Abnett and drawn by Lee Sullivan and Mark Farmer. Frost was working undercover and investigating Stranks, the owner of a night club suspected of selling a potent street drug called Mandrake.

At the same time, the Seventh Doctor and Ace had been drawn to Earth at the close of the 20th century by the alien energy structure known as the Mandragora Helix, which the Doctor had last encountered 500 years before. When told of Frost's investigation, the Doctor pointed out that another name for Mandrake was Mandragora. The similarity in names was no coincidence — the Mandragora Helix had contacted Stranks and used him to produce Mandrake, which sapped the will of its users, making them susceptible to the Helix's influence. Together with Frost, the Doctor and Ace thwarted the Helix once again.

Frost next appeared in the Andrew Cartmel-penned Evening's Empire (Doctor Who Holiday Special 1993), where she was now a Colonel (the result of a field promotion towards the end of Mark of Mandragora), and investigating the crash of a World War II fighter plane. With the help of the Seventh Doctor, Frost entered the mind of the dead pilot and discovered that the crash was a result of a collision with an alien spacecraft. The local records clerk, Alex Evening, had taken possession of the miniature alien craft and was using its abilities to turn fantasy into reality to kidnap beautiful women, placing them in an imaginary empire of his own creation. The Doctor and Frost entered Evening's empire with UNIT troops and managed to destroy the illusion, sending Evening into an irrecoverable coma.

An alternate universe version of Colonel Frost appeared in the comic strip Final Genesis (DWM #203-#206), in a world where humans and Silurians were working together. There, she was a member of URIC, the United Races Intelligence Command, UNIT's equivalent in that alternate world.

Other appearances
Frost is one of the few characters from the comic strip that has made the cross-over into the other spin-off media. She made a brief appearance (holding the rank of captain in 1980) in the Big Finish Productions audio play The Fires of Vulcan (voiced by Karen Henson).

In a link to the 2005 episode "Aliens of London", a page from the "official" UNIT website created by the BBC for the 2005 series of Doctor Who mentioned a formidable female UNIT officer named Frost, who was stationed in Geneva as of the year 2006.

In the episode itself, a female UNIT major general in a United States Army uniform, wearing a tag with the name "Frost" was among a group of "alien experts" killed by the Slitheen. According to the Series One Companion, early drafts of the script had the Ninth Doctor refer to her explicitly as "Muriel Frost", but the line never made it to screen. The situation is muddled somewhat by the use of Muriel Frost as a narrator of the episode guide in the  children's Doctor Who Classified! 3D Dossier, which would suggest that she is still alive.

Comics characters introduced in 1991
Doctor Who comic strip characters
Doctor Who audio characters
Female characters in comics
UNIT personnel
Fictional colonels